Senator Hatfield may refer to:

Members of the United States Senate
Henry D. Hatfield (1875–1962), U.S. Senator from West Virginia from 1929 to 1935
Mark Hatfield (1922–2011), U.S. Senator from Oregon from 1967 to 1997
Paul G. Hatfield (1928–2000), U.S. Senator from Montana in 1978

United States state senate members
Brian Hatfield (born 1966), Washington State Senate
Ernest I. Hatfield (1890–1977), New York State Senate